Oregon Route 140 (OR 140) is a state highway in southern Oregon, United States. It is the longest state highway in Oregon, running  from the community of White City, Oregon (just north of Medford), through Klamath Falls and on to Lakeview. It then continues east, eventually descending into the state of Nevada.

Route description

OR 140 begins in White City at a junction with Oregon Route 62 (which runs between Medford and Crater Lake National Park). OR 140 is the primary connection between Medford and Klamath Falls. The stretch of OR 140 between the two cities is known as the Lake of the Woods Highway No. 270 (see Oregon highways and routes), as it passes by the scenic Lake of the Woods and Mount McLoughlin in the Sky Lakes Wilderness. It then runs along the southwestern shore of Upper Klamath Lake, where it is part of the Volcanic Legacy Scenic Byway. Upon entering the Klamath Falls area, it joins together with Oregon Route 66 (which runs between Klamath Falls and Ashland) on the Green Springs Highway No. 21, and the two highways soon intersect with U.S. Route 97 at a freeway interchange.

OR 140 continues east of here, on an alignment known either as the South Klamath Falls Highway No. 424 or the Southside Bypass.  Southeast of town, OR 140 intersects with Oregon Route 39, heads north on a shared alignment for about two miles (3 km), on the Klamath Falls-Malin Highway No. 50, and then continues east towards Lakeview on the Klamath Falls-Lakeview Highway No. 20.

In Lakeview, the highway meets U.S. Route 395 on the Fremont Highway No. 19 and runs concurrently with it north for 4.6 miles (7.4 km). Then it heads east as Warner Highway No. 431, skirting the south end of Warner Valley and traversing the Doherty Slide before reaching the Nevada state line, where it becomes Nevada State Route 140.

Major intersections

See also

 List of state highways in Oregon
 List of highways numbered 140

References

External links

 Sykotyk's Super Trip: Nevada/Oregon Route 140 - A motorist's trip along SR 140

140
Transportation in Jackson County, Oregon
Transportation in Klamath County, Oregon
Transportation in Lake County, Oregon
Transportation in Harney County, Oregon